Wu You (born 27 March 1984 in Jinzhou, Liaoning) is a female Chinese rower, who won silver medal in the Women's double sculls at the 2008 Summer Olympics. Her race partner was Gao Yulan.

References
 Profile 2008 Beijing

1984 births
Living people
Chinese female rowers
Olympic rowers of China
Olympic silver medalists for China
Rowers at the 2004 Summer Olympics
Rowers at the 2008 Summer Olympics
People from Jinzhou
Olympic medalists in rowing
Rowers from Liaoning
Medalists at the 2008 Summer Olympics
20th-century Chinese women
21st-century Chinese women